Morgan Arritola (born May 13, 1986 in California) is an American cross-country skier who has competed since 2005. Her best World Cup finish was 11th in a 4 × 5 km relay in Switzerland in 2007 while her best individual finish was 24th in a 7.5 km + 7.5 km double pursuit event in Canada in 2008.

At the FIS Nordic World Ski Championships 2009 in Liberec, Arritola had her best finish of 14th in the 4 × 5 km relay and her best individual finish of 22nd in the 30 km mass start.

It was announced on 19 January 2010 that she had qualified for the 2010 Winter Olympics where she earned her best finish of 12th in the 4 × 5 km relay and her best individual finish of 34th in the 10 km event.

Arritola competed in the World Mountain Running Championships in 2012 in Ponte di Legno, Italy, finishing third overall.  Morgan won a bronze individual medal and led the US Women's Team to a gold medal.  Arritola was the U.S. Mountain Running national champion in 2013 and 2015, and runner-up in 2014.

Arritola began her college education at Westminster College in Salt Lake City before being recruited for professional sport.

Cross-country skiing results
All results are sourced from the International Ski Federation (FIS).

Olympic Games

World Championships

World Cup

Season standings

References

External links

NBCOlympics.com announcement of the 2010 cross-country skiing team. 

1986 births
American female cross-country skiers
Cross-country skiers at the 2010 Winter Olympics
Living people
Olympic cross-country skiers of the United States
American female mountain runners
21st-century American women